The common south-west ctenotus (Ctenotus labillardieri)  is a species of skink found in Western Australia.

References

labillardieri
Reptiles described in 1839
Taxa named by André Marie Constant Duméril
Taxa named by Gabriel Bibron